Elvin Ernest Hayes (born November 17, 1945), nicknamed "the Big E", is an American former professional basketball player and radio analyst for his alma-mater Houston Cougars. He is a member of the NBA's 50th and 75th anniversary teams, and an inductee in the Naismith Memorial Basketball Hall of Fame. Known for both his offensive and defensive prowess, Hayes is often regarded as one of the best power forwards in NBA history. Hayes is  also known for his longevity, being third all-time in NBA minutes played (at 50,000), and missing only nine games during his 16 season career.

Early life
In Hayes' senior year at Britton High School, he led his team to the state championship, after averaging 35 points a game during the regular season. In the championship game victory, Hayes scored 45 points and grabbed 20 rebounds.

College career

In 1966, Hayes led the Houston Cougars into the Western Regional semifinals of the 1966 NCAA Men's Division I Basketball Tournament before the Cougars lost to the Pac-8 champion Oregon State Beavers.
 
In 1967, Hayes led the Cougars to the Final Four of the 1967 NCAA Men's Division I Basketball Tournament. He would attempt 31 field goals, score 25 points, and get 24 rebounds in a 73–58 semifinal loss to the eventual champion UCLA Bruins featuring Lew Alcindor (now known as Kareem Abdul-Jabbar). Hayes' rebounding total is second to Bill Russell's Final Four record of 27.

On January 20, 1968, Hayes and the Houston Cougars faced Alcindor and the UCLA Bruins in the first-ever nationally-televised regular-season college basketball game. In front of a record crowd of 52,693 fans at the Houston Astrodome, Hayes scored 39 points and had 15 rebounds while limiting Alcindor to just 15 points as Houston beat UCLA 71–69 to snap the Bruins' 47-game winning streak in what has been called the "Game of the Century". That game helped Hayes earn The Sporting News College Basketball Player of the Year.

In the rematch to the "Game of the Century", Hayes faced Alcindor and UCLA in the 1968 NCAA Men's Division I Basketball Tournament at the Los Angeles Memorial Sports Arena. UCLA coach John Wooden had the Bruins play a "triangle and two" zone defense with Alcindor playing behind Hayes and Lynn Shackleford fronting him. Hayes was held to 10 points, losing to Alcindor and the Bruins 101–69 in the semi-final game.

Hayes led Houston in scoring in each of three seasons (1966: 27.2 points per game, 1967: 28.4, and 1968: 36.8).  For his college career, Hayes averaged 31.0 points per game and 17.2 rebounds per game. He has the most rebounds in NCAA tournament history at 222. While a student at Houston, Hayes was initiated into the Alpha Nu Omega Chapter of the Iota Phi Theta fraternity alongside fellow future Hall of Famer Calvin Murphy.

With his departure from college, Hayes was selected as the first overall selection in both the 1968 NBA draft and 1968 ABA draft. He was taken by the San Diego Rockets and the Houston Mavericks, respectively.

Professional career

San Diego / Houston Rockets (1968–1972)
Hayes joined the NBA with the San Diego Rockets in 1968 and went on to lead the NBA in scoring with 28.4 points per game, averaged 17.1 rebounds per game, and was named to the NBA All-Rookie Team.  Hayes' scoring average is the fifth best all-time for a rookie, and he remains the last rookie to lead the NBA in scoring average. He scored a career-high 54 points against the Detroit Pistons on November 11, 1968.

In Hayes' second season, he led the NBA in rebounding, becoming the first player other than Bill Russell or Wilt Chamberlain to lead the category since 1957 (Chamberlain was injured during much of the season).  In Hayes' third season, 1970–71, he scored a career-best 28.7 points per game. In 1971, the Rockets moved to Houston, enabling Hayes to play in the city of his college triumphs.

Baltimore / Capital / Washington Bullets (1972–1981)

After a series of conflicts with Houston coach Tex Winter, Hayes was traded away to the Baltimore Bullets for Jack Marin and undisclosed considerations on June 23, 1972.

In the 1974 NBA Playoffs, during the franchise's only year called the Capital Bullets, Hayes averaged postseason career-bests of 25.9 points and 15.9 rebounds per game in a Bullets 4–3 first round series loss to the New York Knicks.

Hayes, along with co-star Wes Unseld, led the Washington Bullets to three NBA Finals appearances (1975, 1978 and 1979), and an NBA title over the Seattle SuperSonics in 1978. On March 3, 1978, Hayes set a career-high of 11 blocks in a single game, while also scoring 22 points and grabbing 27 rebounds, in a 124–108 win over the Detroit Pistons. During the Bullets' championship run that postseason, while aided by the addition of Bob Dandridge, Hayes averaged 21.8 points and 12.1 rebounds per game in 21 playoff games, as Washington won their only NBA title to date.

Hayes set an NBA Finals record for most offensive rebounds in a game (11), the following year, in a May 27, 1979 game against the SuperSonics. The Chicago Bulls' Dennis Rodman would tie this record twice, both games coming in the 1996 NBA Finals, also against the SuperSonics.

Return to the Rockets (1981–1984)
Desiring to finish his playing career in Texas and preferably Houston, Hayes was sent back to the Rockets for second-round draft picks in 1981 (Charles Davis) and 1983 (Sidney Lowe) on June 8, 1981.

After basketball
Shortly after finishing his career in the NBA, Hayes returned to the University of Houston to finish the last 30 credit hours of his undergraduate degree.  When interviewed about the experience, Hayes mentioned, "I played 16 years of pro basketball, but this is the hardest thing I've ever done."

In November 2007, Hayes became a Liberty County, Texas, sheriff's deputy, fulfilling a childhood dream. On November 22, 2010, it was announced that he would serve as an analyst for radio broadcasts of Houston Cougars games on Houston's KBME.

Hayes had his #44 jersey retired by the Houston Rockets on November 18, 2022.

Personal life 
Hayes converted to Catholicism in the 1970s.

Stats and honors
In his career with the San Diego / Houston Rockets and the Baltimore / Capital / Washington Bullets, Hayes played 1,303 games over 16 seasons, registering 27,313 points (eleventh all-time) and 16,279 rebounds (fourth all-time). He is the all-time leading scorer for the Washington Bullets/Wizards. Hayes never missed more than two games in any of his 16 seasons in the NBA. In addition to his 1968 scoring title, he led the NBA in rebounding in 1970 and 1974.  Hayes played in 12 straight NBA All-Star Games from 1969 to 1980. He retired holding the NBA record for total regular-season minutes played, with exactly 50,000.

Hayes was elected to the Naismith Memorial Basketball Hall of Fame in 1990. He was named one of the 50 Greatest Players in NBA History in 1996 and voted to the NBA 75th Anniversary Team in 2021. He boycotted the Hall of Fame beginning in 1990 and refused to return until Guy Lewis, his coach at the University of Houston, was admitted.

In 2003, Hayes was inducted into the Breitbard Hall of Fame, which honors San Diego's finest athletes.

NBA career statistics

Regular season

|-
| style="text-align:left;"|
| style="text-align:left;"|San Diego
| 82 ||  || 45.1 || .447 ||  || .626 || 17.1 || 1.4 ||  ||  ||  style="background:#cfecec;"| 28.4*
|-
| style="text-align:left;"|
| style="text-align:left;"|San Diego
| style="background:#cfecec;"|82* ||  || style="background:#cfecec;"|44.7*  || .452 ||  || .688 || bgcolor="CFECEC" |16.9* || 2.0 ||  ||  || 27.5
|-
| style="text-align:left;"|
| style="text-align:left;"|San Diego
| 82 ||  || 44.3 || .428 ||  || .672 || 16.6 || 2.3 ||  ||  || 28.7
|-
| style="text-align:left;"|
| style="text-align:left;"| Houston
| 82 ||  || 42.2 || .434 ||  || .649 || 14.6 || 3.3 ||  ||  || 25.2
|-
| style="text-align:left;"|
| style="text-align:left;"|Baltimore
| 81 ||  || 32.1 || .444 ||  || .671 || 14.1 || 1.6 ||  ||  || 21.2
|-
| style="text-align:left;"|
| style="text-align:left;"|Capital
| 81 ||  || style="background:#cfecec;"|44.5* || .423 ||  || .721 || bgcolor="CFECEC" |18.1* || 2.0 || 1.1 || 3.0 || 21.4
|-
| style="text-align:left;"|
| style="text-align:left;"|Washington
| 82 ||  || 42.3 || .443 ||  || .766 || 12.2 || 2.5 || 1.9 || 2.3 || 23.0
|-
| style="text-align:left;"|
| style="text-align:left;"|Washington
| 80 ||  || 37.2 || .470 ||  || .628 || 11.0 || 1.5 || 1.3 || 2.5 || 19.8
|-
| style="text-align:left;"|
| style="text-align:left;"|Washington
| 82 ||  || 41.0 || .501 ||  || .687 || 12.5 || 1.9 || 1.1 || 2.7 || 23.7
|-
| style="text-align:left; background:#afe6ba;"|†
| style="text-align:left;"|Washington
| 81 ||  || 40.1 || .451 ||  || .634 || 13.3 || 1.8 || 1.2 || 2.0 || 19.7
|-
| style="text-align:left;"|
| style="text-align:left;"|Washington
| 82 ||  || 37.9 || .487 ||  || .654 || 12.1 || 1.7 || .9 || 2.3 || 21.8
|-
| style="text-align:left;"|
| style="text-align:left;"|Washington
| 81 ||  || 39.3 || .454 || .231 || .699 || 11.1 || 1.6 || .8 || 2.3 || 23.0
|-
| style="text-align:left;"|
| style="text-align:left;"|Washington
| 81 ||  || 36.2 || .451 || .000 || .617 || 9.7 || 1.2 || .8 || 2.1 || 17.8
|-
| style="text-align:left;"|
| style="text-align:left;"|Houston
| 82 || 82 || 37.0 || .472 || .000 || .664 || 9.1 || 1.8 || .8 || 1.3 || 16.1
|-
| style="text-align:left;"|
| style="text-align:left;"|Houston
| 81 || 43 || 28.4 || .476 || .500 || .683 || 7.6 || 2.0 || .6 || 1.0 || 12.9
|-
| style="text-align:left;"|
| style="text-align:left;"|Houston
| 81 || 4 || 12.3 || .406 || .000 || .652 || 3.2 || .9 || .2 || .3 || 5.0
|- class="sortbottom"
| style="text-align:center;" colspan=2|Career 
| 1,303 || 129 || 38.4 || .452 || .147 || .670 || 12.5 || 1.8 || 1.0 || 2.0 || 21.0
|- class="sortbottom"
| style="text-align:center;" colspan=2|All-Star
| 12 || 4 || 22.0 || .403 ||  || .647 || 7.7 || 1.4 || – || – || 10.5

Playoffs 

|-
| style="text-align:left;"|1969
|style="text-align:left;"|San Diego
|6||||46.3||.526||||.660||13.8||.8||||||25.8
|-
| style="text-align:left;|1973
|style="text-align:left;"|Baltimore
|5||||45.6||.505||||.697||11.4||1.0||||||25.8
|-
| style="text-align:left;"|1974
|style="text-align:left;"|Capital
|7||||46.1||.531||||.707||15.9||3.0||0.7||2.1||25.9
|-
| style="text-align:left;|1975
|style="text-align:left;"|Washington
|17||||44.2||.468||||.677||10.9||2.2||1.5||2.3||25.5
|-
| style="text-align:left;|1976
|style="text-align:left;"|Washington
|7||||43.6||.443||||.582||12.6||1.4||.7||4.0||20.0
|-
| style="text-align:left;"|1977
|style="text-align:left;"|Washington
|9||||45.0||.563||||.695||13.6||1.9||1.1||2.4||21.0
|-
| style="text-align:left;background:#afe6ba;"|1978†
|style="text-align:left;"|Washington
|21||||41.3||.491|||||.594||13.3||2.0||1.5||2.5||21.8
|-
| style="text-align:left;"|1979
|style="text-align:left;"|Washington
|19||||41.4||.429||||.669||14.0||5.0||.9||2.7||22.5
|-
| style="text-align:left;"|1980
|style="text-align:left;"|Washington
|2||||46.0||.390||||.800||11.0||3.0||.0||2.0||20.0
|-
| style="text-align:left;|1982
|style="text-align:left;"|Houston
|3||||41.3||.340||||.533||10.0||1.0||.7||3.3||14.0
|-
| style="text-align:center;" colspan="2"| Career
| 96 ||  || 43.3 || .464 ||  || .652 || 13.0 || 1.9 || 1.1 || 2.6 || 22.9

See also

NBA
List of National Basketball Association career games played leaders
 List of National Basketball Association franchise career scoring leaders
 List of National Basketball Association career scoring leaders
 List of National Basketball Association career rebounding leaders
 List of National Basketball Association career blocks leaders
 List of National Basketball Association career free throw scoring leaders
 List of National Basketball Association career minutes played leaders
 List of National Basketball Association career playoff blocks leaders
 List of National Basketball Association single-game blocks leaders
 List of individual National Basketball Association scoring leaders by season
 List of National Basketball Association annual minutes leaders
 List of National Basketball Association annual rebounding leaders
 List of National Basketball Association top rookie scoring averages

College
 List of NCAA Division I men's basketball players with 60 or more points in a game
 List of NCAA Division I men's basketball players with 2000 points and 1000 rebounds
 List of NCAA Division I men's basketball career rebounding leaders

References

Further reading

External links

NBA.com biography
Basketball Hall of Fame biography
ClutchFans.net Profile – Houston Rocket Fan Site
NBA.com history: Elvin Hayes
Elvin Hayes to join radio crew

1945 births
Living people
African-American basketball players
All-American college men's basketball players
American men's basketball players
Baltimore Bullets (1963–1973) players
Basketball players from Louisiana
Capital Bullets players
Centers (basketball)
Houston Cougars men's basketball players
Houston Mavericks draft picks
Houston Rockets players
Naismith Memorial Basketball Hall of Fame inductees
National Basketball Association All-Stars
National Basketball Association players with retired numbers
National Collegiate Basketball Hall of Fame inductees
People from Rayville, Louisiana
Power forwards (basketball)
San Diego Rockets draft picks
San Diego Rockets players
Washington Bullets players
21st-century African-American people
20th-century African-American sportspeople
African-American Catholics